Niphoparmena alluaudi is a species of beetle in the family Cerambycidae. It was described by Villiers in 1940.

References

alluaudi
Beetles described in 1940